Jintur city and a municipal council in Parbhani district in the Indian state of Maharashtra.

Geography
It has an average elevation of 455 metres (1492 feet).

Demographics
As population of 2011 India census, Jintur has population of 44,291 of which 22,616 are males while 21,675 are females. Jintur has female sex ratio is of 958 higher than Maharashtra state average of 929.

Literacy rate of Jintur city is 78.26% lower than state average of 82.34%. In Jintur, Male literacy is around 83.45% while female literacy rate is 72.90%.  In Jintur, 14.83% of the population is under 6 years of age.

Schedule Caste (SC) constitutes 8.91% while Schedule Tribe (ST) were 1.80% of total population in Jintur.

Historical Places 
Shri Digamber Jain Atishya Kshetra Nemgiri Samsthan Jintur
There are two hills Nemgiri and Chandragiri famous for their ancient artistic and miraculous Jain Cave Temples and Chaityalayas.

Nemgiri Hill

There are seven caves and Idols of Bhagvan Mahaveer, Bhagvan Adinath, Bhagvan Shantinath, Bhagvan Neminath, Bhagvan Parshwanath, Nandishwar and Bhagvan Bahubali. In first cave of Nemgiri, an attractive idol of Lord Mahaveer in cross legged seating posture is installed, 3.5 feet in height. This was installed in V.S. 1676. Ancient feet images of Acharya Bhadrabahu also attract pilgrims. In second cave there is an ancient idol of Lord Adinath in state of meditation & penance.  In third cave there a 6-foot idol of Lord Shantinath with symbol of deer is seen. Few years ago, black marble has been installed underneath.
In a fourth cave 7.5-foot-high beautiful idol of Baghwan Neminath in cross legged seating posture is seen. Bhagvan Neminath idol is the largest Padmasanastha idol and in Cave Number 5 a miraculous idol of Lord Antariksha Parshwanath is staying in the space 3 inches high from surface. The tiny sixth cave has 4.5-foot Nandishwar. However it is considered as a Manastambha for Mulnayak Neminath bhagwaan with four heads in four directions. The last one, the seventh cave has an idol standing 5.5 feet high of Lord Bahubali.
These temples are at least 400 years old. They were created by King Sanghavi and his family, and currently maintained by the Digamber Jain samaj Jintur.
Two more Digamber Jain temples are situated in city, one is Shree Parshvanath Digamber Jain Mandir, with glass work, and another one is Shree Mahaveer Digamber Jain Mandir.

Chandragiri Hill 
A Choubeesee includes standing idols of Lord Shantinath, Kunthunath & Arahnath. These were installed in V.S. 1665.
Charthana - Name of this village came from the King Charudatta who ruled this area. Charthana has 365 hemadpanthi temples around this area. Apart from it ~40 temples are visible, which include a Barav, and temples built in the 11th century.

Other Hindu temples 
1. Shree 1008 Bhagavan Mahaveer Digambar Jain Mandir
2. Shri Nrusimha Temple Varud
3. Sai Baba Mandir
4. Balaji Mandir
5. Gajanan Mandir
6. Gajanan Maharaj Mandir, Halvira
7. Mainapuri temple
8. Pachalegaon temple
9. Sidheshwar temple
10. Nathuram Maharaj temple
11. Shri Ram mandir 
12. Motha Maroti mandir
13. Shri Ramban devi mandir
14. Amba devi mandir Bhogaon
15. Shree Chintamani Parasnath Digmbar Jain mandir
16. Shree Ishwarshing maharaj Amargad
17. Jay sevalal maharaj Mandir, Amaragad
18. Shree Nagreshwar Mandir
19.Mhasoba Temple Itoli
20.Jagrut Hanuman Mandir Ghagara

21.Bhavani Aai Mandir, Limbala

22.Bharati Math Sansthan, Limbala

23.Jagdamba Mandir Bhogaon

24,shri devanand baba ashram dabha

Education

There are many good institutions around the town, like Government Polytechnic Institute, Government Industrial Training Institute, Dyaneshwar Vidyalaya, Bordikar English school New Era English School, Jawahar Vidyalaya, Vilasrao Deshmukh Urdu High School And Junior College‚ Eklavya Balvidya Mandir (primary & secondary), DSM college, Spartan Institute of Education and Research, Jintur, Podar Jumbo Kids, Krantisinh Nana Patil Vastigruh, Shivaji Nagar, Jintur, Dr. Zakair Husain primary and High school jintur.

Transport
Nearest operational airport are at Nanded 98 km (61 mi) and Aurangabad . There are many buses to Jintur from Parbhani, Nanded and Aurangbad on daily basis.

See also

 Zari
 Bori
 Charthana
 Brahmangaon
 Nemgiri
 Amargad yenoli
 Kehal tanda
 Limbala
 Bharati Math Sansthan, Limbala

References

Cities and towns in Parbhani district
Talukas in Maharashtra